Sékouba Camara may refer to:

 Sékouba Camara (footballer, born 1983), Guinean football defender
 Sékouba Camara (footballer, born 1997), Guinean football goalkeeper